Francisco Rodrigues da Silva also known as "Nunca" is a Brazilian artist who uses a graffiti technique to create images that confront modern urban Brazil with its native past.  His name Nunca ("Never" in Portuguese) is an affirmation of his determination not to be bound by cultural or psychological constraints. Nunca is one of the most famous street artists of his generation.

Career
Born in São Paulo, Nunca began his career at the age of 12 as a member of a gang spraying pichações  - a Brazilian alternative tag -  on walls in Itaquera, the poor neighborhood in eastern São Paulo where the family lived. He then developed his own style, a mix of colors and lines putting together Brazilian traditions and contemporary claims.

After the family moved to Aclimação, in the south-central part of the city, he made new friends and developed an interest in grafite, a more consciously artistic form.  He has described this as a natural progression - he had always liked drawing. He started to produce striking, intensely coloured figures inspired by indigenous Brazilian culture that attracted first local and then foreign attention.
 
Starting to receive invitations to exhibit in Europe, he began to paint canvases and produce sculptures. Although enjoying his work on the street he was keen to produce more elaborate work and saw this as another natural progression.

Nunca’s practice is deeply rooted in the urban environment and attuned to the history of his native Brazil. His art challenges cultural conventions by exploring the modes through which contemporary society functions. Nunca investigates social, politic and economic realities to question mass consumerism, whether it is material or cultural, and its driving mechanism.

Often revealed in the context of the street, his art transforms the monotonous circulation through our cities with works that alter the viewers’ physical sense of self and surrounding world. Therefore questioning the manipulation of art and public opinion. Forced to engage with it, the viewers are challenged over these visions of protest. They  denounce the inequalities, the false information and illegitimate heritage conveyed among population by the power in place, as well as the aptitude of some journalistic organs to spread opinions as consistent facts that quickly gain status of truth.

Influences and references
Nunca's distinctive style is a dialogue between antique etching: a reference to the techniques used by the conquistadors to portray indigenous tribes and depict the New World, and local iconography with modern treatments.

This delicate manipulation of antique and contemporary references integrated to the use of graffiti writing, as well as the different manipulations applied on the wall: embossed, painted and carved, is his recognizable signature. It has inspired an entire generation of street artist. His influence grew worldwide after being the youngest artist exhibited in a major show at the Tate Modern museum in London in 2008. Nunca was described as "one of the rising stars of the São Paulo graffiti scene" in the 2005 book Graffiti Brazil  which devoted an entire chapter to his work.  He has worked closely with other major figures on the São Paulo graffiti scene including Os Gêmeos (the artist twins Otavio and Gustavo Pandolfo) and Otavio Pandolfo's wife, Nina.

Cultural impact
Having developed their reputation in São Paulo Nunca and the Pandolfos were invited to participate in a street-art exhibition at the Tate Modern Gallery in London that led to a significant re-evaluation of their work by their home city.  Following the introduction by the Mayor of São Paulo Gilberto Kassab of the "Cidade Limpa" ("Clean City") law aimed at eliminating forms of visual pollution, including graffiti, an official clean-up campaign led to many images being lost and others damaged. A 680-meter mural painted by the Pandolfos, Nunca and Otavio Pandolfo's wife Nina on retaining walls along the 23 de Maio expressway was half-obliterated with gray paint despite having been officially approved.  Recognition abroad of the significance of the artists' work stimulated a public discussion of what constituted art which led to the creation of a registry of street art to be preserved by the city of São Paulo.

Exhibitions
Nunca has exhibited in Brazil at the Museum of Modern Art in São Paulo and around the world, notably in Greece at the AfroBrasil Museum and in the UK at Tate Modern, the first major display of street art at a public museum in London.  The brickwork of the Tate Modern's external walls was decorated with paintings 15 metres high by the artists featured in the exhibition, the Pandolfo twins and Nunca, Blu from Bologna, the Parisian artist JR, the New York collaborative group Faile and Sixeart from Barcelona.

Nunca’s most notable exhibitions also include Tag at the Grand Palais in Paris in 2009; The boneyard Project in Arizona in 2012 for which the artist painted the fuselage of a World War II airplane; Hecho En Oaxaca, at the Museo de Arte Contemporaneo in Mexico in 2013; One of the largest figurative mural for the Frestas Triennial of Soroccaba in Brazil in 2017  and Art from the Streets at the ArtScience Museum in Singapore in 2018.

His work has been shown in galleries and institutions around the world including: Hong Kong, Bejiing, Miami, Los Angeles, Milan, Bologna, Lisbon, Kyiv etc. Nunca was also the subject of many books and publications, including The Huffington Post, NY and LA Times as well as Art Review.

References

Brazilian graffiti artists
Living people
Year of birth missing (living people)